Sekoteng, a ginger-based hot drink which includes peanuts, diced bread, and pacar cina, can be found in Jakarta, West Java, and Central Java.

See also

 Bajigur
 List of Indonesian beverages

References

Hot drinks
Indonesian drinks